Franklin Davenport (September 1755July 27, 1832) was a Federalist Party United States Senator and US Representative from New Jersey.

Biography
Davenport was born in Philadelphia in the Province of Pennsylvania and his uncle was Benjamin Franklin. He received an academic education; studied law in Burlington, New Jersey; admitted to the New Jersey State Bar in 1776 and commenced practice in Gloucester City, New Jersey. He was the clerk of Gloucester County Court in 1776; during the American Revolutionary War he enlisted as a private in the New Jersey Militia, later becoming brigade major, then brigade quartermaster, and in 1778 assistant quartermaster for Gloucester County. he was appointed colonel in the New Jersey Militia in 1779 and subsequently major general, which rank he held until his death; prosecutor of pleas in 1777.

New Jersey
He moved to Woodbury, New Jersey in 1781 and continued the practice of law; appointed first surrogate of Gloucester County in 1785; member of the New Jersey General Assembly from 1786–1789; colonel in the New Jersey Line during the Whiskey Insurrection of 1794; appointed brigadier general of Gloucester County Militia in 1796; appointed to the United States Senate as a Federalist to fill the vacancy caused by the resignation of John Rutherfurd, and served from December 5, 1798, to March 3, 1799, when a successor was elected and qualified.

Elected to the Congress
He was elected to the Sixth United States Congress from the southern district (March 4, 1799 – March 3, 1801); was defeated for reelection in 1800 running on the statewide Federalist ticket; resumed the practice of law; appointed master in chancery in 1826; died in Woodbury, Gloucester County, N.J.; interment in Presbyterian Cemetery in north Woodbury, New Jersey.

References 

1755 births
1832 deaths
Politicians from Philadelphia
People of colonial Pennsylvania
American people of English descent
Federalist Party United States senators from New Jersey
Federalist Party members of the United States House of Representatives from New Jersey
Members of the New Jersey General Assembly
Politicians from Woodbury, New Jersey
People of New Jersey in the American Revolution